Pepe Auth Stewart (born 6 March 1957) is a Chilean politician commonly known for having served as deputy during the 2010s.

References

External links
 

1957 births
Living people
University of Chile alumni
School for Advanced Studies in the Social Sciences alumni
Party for Democracy (Chile) politicians
Radical Social Democratic Party of Chile politicians
Radical Party of Chile politicians
Chilean political commentators